The 2001 Michigan State Spartans football team represented Michigan State University in the 2001 NCAA Division I-A football season.  The Spartans played their home games at Spartan Stadium in East Lansing, Michigan. This was the second year for head coach Bobby Williams, who led the Spartans to a 7-5 record including a 44–35 victory in the 2001 Silicon Valley Football Classic over the Fresno State Bulldogs of the Western Athletic Conference.

The controversial final play of the home game against Michigan on November 3 led to a change in the official timekeeping policy of the Big Ten Conference.  Beginning in 2002, a neutral official appointed by the Big Ten keeps track of the game time on the field.

Schedule

 Note: The was Missouri game originally scheduled for September 15 was rescheduled to December 1 because of the September 11 attacks.

Roster

References

Michigan State
Michigan State Spartans football seasons
Silicon Valley Football Classic champion seasons
Michigan State Spartans football